Nizhniye Khalchi is a rural locality in Soldatsky Selsoviet Rural Settlement, Fatezhsky District, Kursk Oblast, Russia. The population as of 2010 is 186.

Geography 
The village is located on the Khalchi River (a link tributary of the Usozha in the basin of the Svapa), 89 km from the Russia–Ukraine border, 47 km north-west of Kursk, 13 km south-west of the district center – the town Fatezh, 6 km from the selsoviet center – Soldatskoye.

Climate
Nizhniye Khalchi has a warm-summer humid continental climate (Dfb in the Köppen climate classification).

Transport 
Nizhniye Khalchi is located 11 km from the federal route  Crimea Highway as part of the European route E105, 7 km from the road of regional importance  (Fatezh – Dmitriyev), 2 km from the road of intermunicipal significance  (38K-038 – Soldatskoye – Shuklino), on the road  (38N-679 – Verkhniye Khalchi), 27 km from the nearest railway halt 29 km (railway line Arbuzovo – Luzhki-Orlovskiye).

The rural locality is situated 52 km from Kursk Vostochny Airport, 165 km from Belgorod International Airport and 245 km from Voronezh Peter the Great Airport.

References

Notes

Sources

Rural localities in Fatezhsky District